Lanshi station, is a station of Guangfo line of the Foshan Metro and Guangzhou Metro in Foshan's Chancheng District. It started operations on 28 December 2016.

Station layout

Exits

References

Foshan Metro stations
Railway stations in China opened in 2016
Guangzhou Metro stations